Crime Alert - Darna Nahin Mitana Hai ( Crime Alert – Don't be afraid, Have to Erase) is an Indian crime television show that was aired on Dangal TV. It was hosted by Girish Jain, Amit Pachori and Sudha Chandran in their roles. This show is based on the real life crimes that happen in India, with the events dramatized, places changed and people's name altered.

In 2017, the show was relaunched on Dangal TV.

Plot 
The hosts presents a collection of true stories involving ordinary citizens who committed horrific crimes for the sake of love, revenge and various other motivating factors.

Hosts 
 Girish Jain
 Amit Pachori
 Sudha Chandran
 Shakti Anand
 Jiten Lalwani
 Iqbal Khan

Investigating officers 
 Mohit Abrol
 Mahi Sharma
 Vikram Wadhwa

Episodes

Series overview

See also 
 List of programmes broadcast by Dangal TV

References

External links 
 Crime Alert on IMDb
 Crime Alert Season 2 on IMDb
Official Facebook page of Crime Alert
 Crime Alert on Dangal Play

2017 Indian television series debuts
2010s Indian television series
Television series based on actual events
Fictional portrayals of police departments in India
Hindi-language television shows
Indian crime television series
Indian reality television series
Television series by Optimystix Entertainment
Television shows set in Mumbai
Dangal TV original programming